Street Hawk is a video game based on the Street Hawk TV series. It was developed by Ocean Software in the 1980s for the ZX Spectrum home computer. When development on the first attempt stalled in 1985, a new version had to be quickly produced by their in-house team to fulfil orders for Kays Catalogues and never went on general release. This version is sometimes known as the "subscribers edition" as it was offered as a free gift to new subscribers to Crash magazine - the magazine eventually had to offer a choice of other Ocean games - Ping Pong, Movie, Super Bowl and Green Beret - as alternatives.

Ocean went on the develop another version of the game for release in 1986 for the ZX Spectrum and Amstrad CPC. The Commodore 64 version was 90% complete but was canceled by Ocean due to lack of profitability from programming delays. In Spain it was distributed by Erbe Software with the name El Halcón Callejero.

References

External links 

1985 video games
1986 video games
Amstrad CPC games
Cancelled Commodore 64 games
Ocean Software games
ZX Spectrum games
Video games developed in the United Kingdom